Carla Rae MacLeod (born June 16, 1982) is a retired member of the Canadian national women's hockey team. Through her paternal grandmother, MacLeod is related to former Montreal Canadiens legend Maurice Richard.

Playing career
MacLeod was born in Spruce Grove, Alberta. MacLeod attended Bishop Carroll High School in Calgary, Alberta. 

Carla MacLeod represented Team Alberta at the National Championships in 1999 and 2001. On both occasions, MacLeod would win the Abby Hoffman Cup.

Wisconsin Badgers
She played with the Wisconsin Badgers women's ice hockey program in the Western Collegiate Hockey Association for four years, serving as captain for the 03-04 and 04-05 seasons. She played for United States women's Olympic team coach Mark Johnson at Wisconsin, where he likened her leadership to that of a second coach.

While at Wisconsin, MacLeod was bestowed with the University of Wisconsin Big Ten Medal of Honor (in recognition of athletic and academic achievement). In her senior year at Wisconsin, Macleod served as one of two undergraduate assistant coaches.  The other undergrad coach was Olympian Molly Engstrom. Macleod and Engstrom assisted coach Mark Johnson with analysis of game footage.

Hockey Canada
Her career as a defenseman for the national team began in 2003 with a silver win in the Four Nations Cup.  In 2004, she played to a gold medal in the Four Nations Cup.  In 2005, MacLeod made her world championship debut in 2005. She had been cut from the world championship team for two consecutive years before that. MacLeod would win silver at the 2005 IIHF Women's World Hockey Championship.  In 2006, she played in the Winter Olympics in Turin, where she was named as a tournament all-star, and in the 2006 Four Nations Cup, where Canada won gold. In 2007, she played in the IIHF Women's World Hockey Championship, where Canada won its ninth world's gold medal.  Prior to joining the national women's team, MacLeod was on the National Under-22 team from 1999-2003.

Coaching career
In the fall of 2010, she became an assistant coach with Mount Royal University.
During the 2011–12 Canada women's national ice hockey team season, MacLeod was an assistant coach for the National Under 18 team that participated in a three-game series vs. the USA in August 2011. Since February, 2012 she has been serving as an assistant coach for the Japanese national team. In February, 2013 the Japanese national women's hockey team qualified for the first time for the 2014 winter Olympics in Sochi, Russia. Japanese media praise her coaching skills, her likable personality as well as her tactical understanding of the game which has been much needed for this team. They say she has given the players a hockey mentality and a style of play which puts pressure on opposing teams.

In April 2022 she became head coach of Czech Republic women's ice hockey team. During the subsequent 2022 Women's Ice Hockey World Championships, the Czechs won their first bronze medal.

Retirement
On September 14, 2010, Hockey Canada announced that MacLeod, along with three other players retired from international hockey. After her retirement, she took a public relations job with the Royal Bank of Canada.

Career stats

Awards and honours
2004-05 USCHO.com Defensive Player of the Year

References

External links
 
 
 
 
 

1982 births
Living people
Calgary Oval X-Treme players
Canadian women's ice hockey defencemen
Ice hockey people from Alberta
Ice hockey players at the 2006 Winter Olympics
Ice hockey players at the 2010 Winter Olympics
Medalists at the 2006 Winter Olympics
Medalists at the 2010 Winter Olympics
Olympic gold medalists for Canada
Olympic ice hockey players of Canada
Olympic medalists in ice hockey
People from Spruce Grove
Wisconsin Badgers women's ice hockey players